Anne Seddon Kinsolving Brown (1906-1985) was an American historian, socialite, and collector of military memorabilia who married into the prominent Rhode Island Brown family, founders of Brown University.

Early life
Anne was born on March 25, 1906, in Brooklyn to Rev. Arthur B. and Sally Bruce Kinsolving.  When she was six months old her family moved to Baltimore where her father took the position of rector at Old St. Paul's Episcopal Church. (Eventually Rev. Kinsolving became Bishop of Baltimore). She was the sister of the Rev. Dr. Arthur Lee Kinsolving, rector of Trinity Church, and later, St. James' Episcopal Church in  New York. Rev. Kinsolving was the father of Lee Kinsolving (1938–1974), the actor.
 
She attended Bryn Mawr School in Baltimore, graduating in 1924.  For the next several years she worked as a journalist for the Baltimore News, writing on a variety of topics including music, theater and art.

Career
Anne Brown began collecting lead toy soldiers during the couple's year-long honeymoon trip to Europe in 1930.  Eventually her interest expanded dramatically to a large collection of military memorabilia, which on her death became the Anne S. K. Brown Military Collection.  Beyond collecting artefacts, she was a general historian, co-founding the Company of Military Historians in 1949.  She was one of the few women military historians.  She also wrote many books and articles.

In 1962, she was given an L.H.D degree from Brown University.  In 1965 she lectured on military history at the University of California.

Personal life
In 1930, she met and married John Nicholas Brown II, a Brown family heir who eventually became Assistant Secretary of the Navy (AIR) from 1946 to 1949. Together, Anne and John had three children:

 Nicholas Brown (b. 1933), a captain in the U.S. Navy who served as the director of the National Aquarium in Baltimore from 1983 to 1995, who married Diane Verne
 John Carter Brown III (1934–2002), who became director of the National Gallery of Art, and was married to Constance Mellon Byers (1942–1983) (daughter of Richard King Mellon), and later, Pamela Braga Drexel (former wife of John R. Drexel IV).
 Angela Bayard Brown (b. 1938), who married Dr. Edwin Garvin Fischer (b. 1937) in 1963, grandson of Edwin Louis Garvin.

Anne Brown died at her home "Harbour Court" in Newport, RI, on November 21, 1985.

Notes

References

1906 births
1985 deaths
Anne S.K.
Bryn Mawr School people
20th-century American historians